Forêts  was a department of the French First Republic, and later the First French Empire, in present-day Belgium, Luxembourg, and Germany.  Its name, meaning 'forests', comes from the Ardennes forests.  It was formed on 24 October 1795, after the Austrian Netherlands had been annexed by France on 1 October.  Before annexation, the territory was part of the Duchy of Luxembourg and little parts of the Duchy of Bouillon. Its capital was Luxembourg City.

14,176 men from the former Duchy of Luxembourg were conscripted into the French Revolutionnary Army and the Grande Armée in these years, of whom 9,809 died on the battlefields of Europe.

After Napoleon was defeated in 1814, most of it became part of the United Kingdom of the Netherlands, with the part on the east side of the rivers Our and Sauer becoming part of Prussia (now Germany). The territory is now divided between the Grand Duchy of Luxembourg, the Belgian province of Luxembourg, and the German state of Rhineland-Palatinate.

The department was subdivided into the following arrondissements and cantons (situation in 1812):

 Luxembourg: cantons Luxembourg (2 cantons), Arlon, Bettembourg, Betzdorf, Grevenmacher, Mersch, Messancy, and Remich (Arlon and Messancy now in Belgium, others in Luxembourg).
 Bitburg: cantons Bitburg, Arzfeld, Dudeldorf, Echternach, and Neuerburg (Echternach now in Luxembourg, others in Germany).
 Diekirch: cantons Diekirch, Clervaux, Ospern, Vianden, and Wiltz (now in Luxembourg). 
 Neufchâteau: cantons Neufchâteau, Bastogne, Étalle, Fauvillers, Florenville, Houffalize, Paliseul, Sibret and Virton (now in Belgium).

Its population in 1812 was 246,333, and its area was 691,035 hectares.

Regime
The administrative, institutional, economic, social, and political framework of Luxembourg was swept away without restraint. Unlike a simple transfer of sovereignty, such as Luxembourg had experienced many over the previous decades, this period was to put Luxembourg and surrounding areas on the path to a new kind of society.

The privileges of the masters and confraternities of artisans were abolished in November 1795. Under the Austrian Netherlands, civil registrations (births, deaths, marriages) were left to the parishes, and linked to sacraments administered by the Church. From June 1796, this changed: registrations were performed by a civil registration officer. Luxembourg was a Catholic society, in which religion was omnipresent and resistant to change. In this traditional society, the secularisation of marriage and the introduction of divorce were fault lines, which caused great consternation.

The institutions and administrative machinery introduced by the French in this period is the origin of today's government institutions in Luxembourg: districts (arrondissements), cantons and communes were introduced under the French, and continue to exist.

French rule in Luxembourg provoked widespread discontent, and the causes for this are several: religious persecutions, the suppression of the religious orders in the city of Luxembourg, military requisitions, taxation, and the introduction of obligatory military service from 1798. This discontent culminated in the Peasants' War that same year, a revolt in the northern part of the department that was limited to the peasantry. Among other classes of society, however, the benefits of the Napoleonic reforms did meet with a level of appreciation.

At the same time, a fundamental characteristic of the French Revolutionary government, administrative centralisation, collided with Luxembourgish traditions: each department received a central commissioner. The department of Forêts saw four commissioners over the years, all of them from France proper.

Economy
In the city of Luxembourg, due to the abolition of the corporations, a commercial and artisanal revolution took place, allowing a middle class to emerge, whose members could for the first time participate in political life under the French regime.

Another development linked to the disappearance of the corporations occurred in the countryside: small artisanal business sprang up, often with only one employee. Employer and worker would enjoy a certain proximity, eating at the same table. In 1803, the livret d'ouvrier (labourer's booklet) was introduced. This was to list what work labourers did for whom, and a reference from their last employer every time they changed workplace. If travelling without their booklet, they could be reported as a vagabond, and punished accordingly. The Code civil's Article 1781 established the "legal superiority of the employer," while the Code pénal in 1810 forbade workers from forming trade unions. These provisions were evidence of a great mistrust of the world of the workers, who were seen as a danger to society. The overarching objective of the livret d'ouvrier was to keep under surveillance a social class judged seen as dangerous, and to prevent poaching of labourers amongst competing enterprises, in this period of manpower shortages. Finally, it represented an "effective means of domination by the employers," and "a veritable internal passport."

Legacy
The Code civil, introduced by the French, had a profound impact on Luxembourgish society, and is still in force 200 years later. Luxembourgish law remains close to French law: Luxembourgish law students study in France or in Belgium. Arguments before the courts, and the announcement of verdicts, are conducted in French. Laws and regulations were published in French and German from 1816, but since 1945, only in French.

Footnotes

References
 

Former departments of France in Belgium
Former departments of France in Germany
Former states and territories of Rhineland-Palatinate
Political history of Luxembourg
History of Luxembourg (Belgium)
History of the Palatinate (region)
1795 establishments in France